Hanbury may refer to:

People
Harold Greville Hanbury (1898–1993), English law academic and Vinerian Professor of English Law at the University of Oxford
John Hanbury (disambiguation), a number of men with this name
Robert Hanbury Brown (1916–2002), British physicist and astronomer
Thomas Hanbury (1832–1907), English businessman, gardener and philanthropist
Daniel Hanbury (1825–1875), a British botanist and pharmacologist

Places
Giardini Botanici Hanbury (Hanbury Botanical Gardens), Liguria, Italy, named after Thomas Hanbury
Hanbury, Staffordshire
Hanbury, Worcestershire
Hanbury, Ontario, Canada
Hanbury Hall, Worcestershire
Hanbury Island, Nunavut, Canada
Hanbury Manor, Hertfordshire, a hotel and country club
Hanbury Street, street in Spitalfields, Tower Hamlets, London

English-language surnames
Surnames of English origin
English toponymic surnames